Bauchi (Bauci, Baushi) is a cluster of Kainji languages spoken in Rafi, Nigeria LGA, Niger State, Nigeria.

Languages
The Baushi languages are (Blench 2012):
Samburu
Ndəkə (Madaka) - three clans: Undo, Sambora, Jibwa
Hupɨnɨ (Supana)
Wãyã (Wayam)
Rubu
Mɨɨn

Blench (2018) lists the Baushi languages as Ndəkə, Hɨpɨn, Mɨɨ, Rub, Samburu, and Wãyã.

Phonology
The Bauchi languages have a set of unusual sounds for the area, called "linguo-labials" by Blench. They are similar to the interdental approximants of the Philippines, where the tongue can protrude slightly over the lower lip.

References

Shiroro languages
Languages of Nigeria